is a Japanese wheelchair tennis player. Ohtani has been active in international competitions since 2016.

Medical history

Ohtani was born healthy. She has been playing tennis since the third grade of primary school. After completing secondary school (high school), she contracted an illness for which she was repeatedly hospitalized. Due to the side effects of medication, she developed cramps in her right leg with paralysis in her right foot, as well as a weakened right hand.

Career
In September 2016, Ohtani took part in the Osaka Open, an ITF3 wheelchair tournament, where she immediately reached the final. She won her first singles title in 2017 at the Vancouver (Canada) tournament. In 2019, she won the ITF2 tournament Brasilia Open in Brazil. In 2018, Ohtani won the bronze medal in the women's singles at the Asian Para Games in Jakarta.

In September 2020, Ohtani took part in a grand slam tournament for the first time, at the US Open. A month later, at Roland Garros, she reached the singles final by beating Kgothatso Montjane and then world number one, Diede de Groot; she lost the final match to her compatriot Yui Kamiji. With this final place she rose to seventh position in the world ranking (October 2020).

At the 2020 Summer Paralympics, Ohtani won the bronze medal in doubles alongside Kamiji.

References

External links
 
 

1995 births
Living people
Japanese female tennis players
Wheelchair tennis players
Paralympic wheelchair tennis players of Japan
Paralympic bronze medalists for Japan
Paralympic medalists in wheelchair tennis
Medalists at the 2020 Summer Paralympics
Wheelchair tennis players at the 2020 Summer Paralympics
People from Tochigi, Tochigi
People with paraplegia
20th-century Japanese women
21st-century Japanese women